In enzymology, 1-phosphatidylinositol-4-phosphate 5-kinase is an enzyme that catalyzes the chemical reaction

ATP + 1-phosphatidyl-1D-myo-inositol 4-phosphate  ADP + 1-phosphatidyl-1D-myo-inositol 4,5-bisphosphate

Thus, the two substrates of this enzyme are ATP and 1-phosphatidyl-1D-myo-inositol 4-phosphate, whereas its two products are ADP and 1-phosphatidyl-1D-myo-inositol 4,5-bisphosphate.

This enzyme belongs to the family of transferases, specifically those transferring phosphorus-containing groups (phosphotransferases) with an alcohol group as acceptor.  The systematic name of this enzyme class is ATP:1-phosphatidyl-1D-myo-inositol-4-phosphate 5-phosphotransferase. Other names in common use include diphosphoinositide kinase, PIP kinase, phosphatidylinositol 4-phosphate kinase, phosphatidylinositol-4-phosphate 5-kinase, and type I PIP kinase.  This enzyme participates in 3 metabolic pathways: inositol phosphate metabolism, phosphatidylinositol signaling system, and regulation of the actin cytoskeleton.

Structural studies

References

 
 
 

EC 2.7.1
Enzymes of known structure